The Citizen is a 2013 American drama independent film directed by Sam Kadi, written by Sam Kadi, Samir Younis, Jazmen Darnell Brown, and starring Khaled El Nabawy, Agnes Bruckner, Rizwan Manji, William Atherton, and Cary Elwes. The Citizen was filmed in New York City, Detroit Masonic Temple in Detroit Michigan, and the Detroit Metropolitan Wayne County Airport in Michigan. The film premiered on September 20, 2012, at the Boston Film Festival.

Plot
The Citizen integrates many true stories of the difficulties and triumphs that Arab-Americans face in 21st-century America. The story follows an Arab immigrant who wins the American green card lottery and arrives in New York City on September 10, 2001 (the day before the September 11th terrorist attacks). The events of 9/11 change the struggles he faces on his way to live out the American Dream.

Cast
 Khaled El Nabawy.... Ibrahim
 Agnes Bruckner.... Diane
 Rizwan Manji.... Mo
 William Atherton.... Winston 
 Cary Elwes.... Miller
 Ajmal Zaheer Ahmad as Rajiv
 Cole Corey.... Josh
 Kerry Birmingham.... Nancy

Production

Development
The Citizen is Sam Kadi's feature film debut. The film was written by director/producer Sam Kadi, Samir Younis, and Jazmen Darnell Brown.

Filming
The Film was shot in New York City, Detroit Masonic Temple in Detroit Michigan, and the Detroit Metropolitan Wayne County Airport in Michigan.

Release
In May 2013, Monterey Media brought the United States distribution rights from the production company 3K Pictures. Radiant Films International handles the foreign rights to the film. Radiant Films International CEO Mimi Steinbauer and President presented the film to buyers in Cannes in 2013. The film was released on DVD and VOD in the United States and Canada on November 12, 2013.

Festivals and awards
The Citizen was selected to screen at the following film festivals:
2012 Boston Film Festival - Winner Best Ensemble Cast & Mass Impact Award
2013 International Family Film Festival - Winner Best Feature Drama
2012 Tri Media Film Festival - Winner Director's Choice Award & Best Actor Award Agnes Bruckner
2012 Hollywood Film Festival - Nominated for Discovery Award
2013 Cinequest Film Festival - Nominated for Audience Choice Award 
2012 Abu Dhabi Film Festival
2012 Heartland Film Festival
2012 Gotham Screen International Film Festival
2013 Shanghai International Film Festival

References

External links

2012 films
American independent films
American drama films
2010s English-language films
2010s American films